Edward Joseph Johnston (born November 24, 1935) is a Canadian former professional ice hockey goaltender and former coach and general manager in the National Hockey League.  His professional career spanned fifty-three years (twenty-two as a player and thirty-one in management), mostly in the NHL. He won two Stanley Cups as a player with the Boston Bruins in 1970 and 1972, and a third in 2009 as senior advisor for hockey operations with the Pittsburgh Penguins, an organization he served in various capacities for twenty-five years.  He was the last NHL goaltender to play every minute of every game in a season, in 1963–64.

Playing career

Johnston grew up in an anglophone neighborhood in Montreal and was often called "E.J.", a nickname by which he is still known. He became interested in ice hockey as a youth and became a goaltender.

Johnston began his hockey career as a teenager in 1953 with the Montreal Junior Royals of the Quebec Junior Hockey League. After six years in the minor leagues in which he won multiple championships, he was called up in 1962 by the Boston Bruins, who owned his rights and for whom he would play the bulk of his NHL career.  In the following season, he played every minute of every game during the regular season, the last NHL goaltender to do so.

The Bruins were a mediocre team in his first five seasons, finishing out of the playoffs every year and often in last place.  This changed after expansion in 1967, when after acquiring Bobby Orr and Phil Esposito, the resurgent Bruins became a powerhouse that won the Stanley Cup in 1970 and 1972.   Serving as a backup to Gerry Cheevers, Johnston played well enough to be named as a backup to Team Canada for the Summit Series in 1972, although he played only in exhibition matches.  The following season, after defections to the new World Hockey Association left Johnston as the number one goaltender for the Bruins once more, he did not play nearly so well, and was traded after the season to the Toronto Maple Leafs in completion of the trade that brought Jacques Plante to Boston.  After one season with the Leafs, Johnston was dealt to the St. Louis Blues, for whom he was a credible backup for three seasons.  In his final season, 1977-78, he played poorly in twelve games for St. Louis and was then sold to the Chicago Black Hawks, for whom he played in four matches to end his playing career.  At the time of his retirement, he was ninth all time in games played by a goaltender, sixteenth all time in goaltending wins and sixth in losses.

On Halloween night in 1968, Johnston was severely injured by Bobby Orr's slapshot to the side of his head during warm-up in Detroit. He spent six weeks in the hospital.

Johnston recorded seven playoff wins for Boston in his career.  That total, as of 2019, ranks him 13th on the Bruins' all-time list for playoff victories by a goaltender.

Johnston's 27 regular-season shutouts ranks him fifth on Boston's all-time list heading into the 2021-22 season, one ahead of longtime teammate Gerry Cheevers.

Coach and general manager
The year after he retired as a player, Johnston became the coach of the New Brunswick Hawks, the Chicago Black Hawks' new American Hockey League farm team, and lead them to a 41–29–10 record and second place in its division.

He became head coach of the Black Hawks during the 1979–80 NHL season and compiled a 34–27–19 record.  The following year, he became head coach of the Pittsburgh Penguins and in 1983 was appointed general manager.  He held the GM post at Pittsburgh for five years.  Johnston oversaw Pittsburgh's selection of Mario Lemieux in the entry draft; without Lemieux, Johnston said in reference to the Penguins' home arena, Mellon Arena, "This place would be a parking lot."  Lemieux would come to be known as the team's repeated savior, as well as one of the greatest hockey players of all-time.

After Johnston left the Penguins for the first time in 1988, he served as the general manager of the Hartford Whalers from 1989 until his release in 1992 where they made the playoffs each of his 4 seasons at the helm.  Johnston's tenure in Hartford is remembered for his trading the organization's marquee player, Ron Francis.   Notably, the Hartford Whalers never made the playoffs after Johnston's departure. 

Johnston traded Francis, along with his roommate Ulf Samuelsson, to Pittsburgh as part of a six-player deal on March 4, 1991.  Although some thought that Hartford got the better end of the bargain as center John Cullen had been among the league leaders in scoring with 94 points in 65 games that season and Zarley Zalapski was seen as a young defenseman with great promise, the deal proved to more beneficial to the Penguins as the popular Francis and Samuelsson immediately went on to play major roles in Pittsburgh's first two Stanley Cup championships in 1991 and 1992, while neither Cullen nor Zalapski could duplicate their success with Pittsburgh in Hartford.

After being considered for the position for the 1992–93 season but having been unable to come to terms on a contract with Pittsburgh, Johnston was once again hired as head coach of the Penguins for 1993–94 and guided the Pens until the 1996–97 season, when he was asked to step down due to the Penguins' failure to win a third Stanley Cup under his guidance. He spent the next nine years as the assistant general manager to Craig Patrick before being named Senior Adviser for Hockey Operations in July 2006, his 23rd year with the Pittsburgh Penguins organization.  It was in that capacity as the Penguins finally won their third Stanley Cup in 2009 that E.J. did the same, winning his first with Pittsburgh, first since 1972, and first as management.

In 2009, he announced that Game 7 of the Finals would be his last and moved into semi-retirement.

On April 8, 2010, Johnston joined more than 50 former Penguins being honored in a pre-game ceremony before the final regular season game at Mellon Arena in Pittsburgh.

On January 7, 2014 against the Vancouver Canucks, Dan Bylsma passed him as the Penguins all-time leader in coaching wins with 233. Johnston remains the Penguins' all-time leader in coaching losses (224) and games coached (516).

Awards and achievements 
EHL First All-Star Team (1960)
EPHL First All-Star Team (1961)
WHL Second All-Star Team (1962)
5 Time Stanley Cup champion (1970, 1972, 2009, 2016, 2017)
Named to play for Team Canada in the 1972 Summit Series

Career statistics

Regular season and playoffs

Coaching record

References

External links

Goaltenders.info profile of Ed Johnston

1935 births
Living people
Anglophone Quebec people
Boston Bruins players
Canadian expatriate ice hockey players in the United States
Canadian ice hockey coaches
Canadian ice hockey goaltenders
Chicago Blackhawks coaches
Chicago Blackhawks players
Edmonton Flyers (WHL) players
Greensboro Generals (EHL) players
Hartford Whalers executives
Ice hockey people from Montreal
Johnstown Jets players
Los Angeles Blades (WHL) players
Montreal Junior Canadiens players
Pittsburgh Penguins coaches
Pittsburgh Penguins executives
St. Louis Blues players
Spokane Comets players
Stanley Cup champions
Toronto Maple Leafs players
Winnipeg Warriors (minor pro) players
New Brunswick Hawks